Berbers in France are people of Berber descent living in France. Berbers in France, who generally call themselves Berbers, are estimated to number over 2 million people.

Notable people

See also
Berbers
Berber Academy

References

 
Ethnic groups in France
French people of Berber descent
Muslim communities in Europe